The 1979 Hardy Cup was the 1979 edition of the Canadian intermediate senior ice hockey championship.

Final
Best of 5
Moncton 8 Quesnel 3
Moncton 10 Quesnel 0
Moncton 6 Quesnel 3
Moncton Hawks beat Quesnel Kangaroos 3-0 on series.

External links
Hockey Canada

Hardy Cup
Hardy